The Simone Awards are a group of awards presented to individuals for their outstanding contributions to high school football in the Kansas City Metropolitan Area.

Beginning with a single award in 1931 presented by Dr. D. M. Nigro, the Simone Awards now represent a group of 6 awards presented to players, broadcasters and coaches to celebrate their efforts on and off the field.

Thomas A. Simone Memorial Award - Outstanding high school football player
Frank Fontana Memorial Award - Outstanding small class high school football player
Junious "Buck" Buchanan Memorial Award - Outstanding big class lineman/linebacker
Bobby Bell Award - Outstanding small class defensive player
Otis Taylor Award - Outstanding tight end/wide receiver
Gordon Docking Award - Outstanding broadcaster
Metro Sports Kansas and Missouri Coaches of the Year - Outstanding Coach

References

External links
Simone Awards

High school football trophies and awards in the United States
High school football in Missouri
High school sports in Kansas
Kansas City metropolitan area